Yeongnyu of Goguryeo (?–642) was the 27th monarch of Goguryeo, the northernmost of the Three Kingdoms of Korea, from 618 to 642.

Family
Father: King Pyeongwon (평원왕, 平原王)
Grandfather: King Yangwon (양원왕, 陽原王)
Unknown wife
Son: Prince Hwangwon (환권, 桓權)
Son: Prince Bokdeok (복덕, 福德)
Daughter: Lady Muyeong (고무영, 高務營)
Daughter: Lady Sukyeong (고숙영, 高肅營)

Background
He was the younger half-brother of the 26th monarch Yeong-yang, and son of the 25th king Pyeongwon. He assumed the throne when Yeong-yang died in 618.

Reign
In China, the Sui dynasty was followed by the Tang dynasty in 618, the year of Yeongnyu's ascension. Goguryeo was recovering from the Goguryeo–Sui War, and the new Tang emperor was still completing its internal unification. Neither being in a position for new hostilities, Goguryeo and Tang exchanged emissaries and upon Tang's request, conducted a prisoner exchange in 622.

In 624, Tang officially presented Taoism to the Goguryeo court, which sent scholars the following year to study Taoism and Buddhism.

However, as Tang gained strength, in 631, it sent a small force to destroy a monument to Goguryeo's victory over the Sui. In response, Goguryeo built the Cheolli Jangseong defensive wall along the western border, a 15-year project begun in 631 under the supervision of Yeon Gaesomun.

During this time, Goguryeo continued its battles to recover lost territory from the southern Korean kingdom Silla. Silla's Kim Yu-sin took Goguryeo's Nangbi fortress in 629.

Fall, death and succession
Yeongnyu and some of the government officials planned to kill some of the more powerful military officers. They planned first to kill Yeon Gaesomun, whose power and influence were rapidly overtaking the throne's. The young man eventually discovered the plot, and immediately went to Pyongyang to kill the plotters, including the king. Yeongnyu was killed in 642.

Yeon Gaesomun placed Yeongnyu's nephew, Bojang, on the throne.

In popular culture
 Portrayed by Choi Jong-hwan in 2006-2007 SBS TV series Yeon Gaesomun.
 Portrayed by Kim Yeong-cheol in 2013 KBS2 TV series The Blade and Petal.
Portrayed in the 2017 KBS TV series Chronicles of Korea.

See also
List of Korean monarchs
Three Kingdoms of Korea
History of Korea

References

Goguryeo rulers
642 deaths
7th-century monarchs in Asia
Year of birth unknown
7th-century Korean people